Frederick George Watson (3 March 1882 – 8 July 1968) was an Australian rules footballer who played with Melbourne in the Victorian Football League (VFL).

Notes

External links 

1882 births
1968 deaths
Australian rules footballers from Victoria (Australia)
Melbourne Football Club players